Justice Mills may refer to:

John T. Mills (1817–1871), associate justice of the Supreme Court of the Republic of Texas
Michael P. Mills (born 1956), associate justice of the Mississippi Supreme Court
William J. Mills (1849–1915), chief justice of the New Mexico Territorial Supreme Court

See also
The Battle of Justice Mills (1644)
Judge Mills (disambiguation)